Alpstein is the second album by Swiss violinist Paul Giger recorded in 1990 and 1991 and released on the ECM label.

Reception
The Allmusic review by Mark W. B. Allender awarded the album 4 stars stating "Violin virtuoso Paul Giger revisits his roots with this, his second solo recording, Alpstein, which features pieces for violin, saxophone, and percussion based on the folk traditions of the Alpstein region of Switzerland... This recording features the saxophone work of Jan Garbarek and the percussion of Pierre Favre. Both add an incredible warmth to the recording on the pieces they are featured on".

Track listing
All compositions by Paul Giger
 "Zäuerli" - 3:07   
 "Karma Shadub" - 13:39   
 "Alpsegen" - 12:38   
 "Zäuerli" - 1:51   
 "Zäuerli" - 2:18   
 "Chuereihe" - 17:33   
 "Chlauseschuppel" - 4:09   
 "Trogener Chilbiläbe" - 7:00
Recorded at Trogen, Switzerland in 1990 and at Rainbow Studio on Oslo, Norway in 1990-1991

Personnel
Paul Giger - violin
Jan Garbarek - tenor saxophone
Pierre Favre - percussion
Musicians from Appenzell, Switzerland - Silvesterchlauseschuppel, Schellenschötter

References

ECM Records albums
Paul Giger albums
Albums produced by Manfred Eicher
1991 albums